Bang-on Xayalath  is a Laotian politician. She is a member of the Lao People's Revolutionary Party. She is a representative of the National Assembly of Laos for the city of Vientiane (Constituency 1).

References

Lao People's Revolutionary Party politicians
21st-century Laotian women politicians
21st-century Laotian politicians
Living people
Members of the National Assembly of Laos
Place of birth missing (living people)
Year of birth missing (living people)